This is a list of secondary characters from the science fiction television series Star Trek: Deep Space Nine. Characters are ordered alphabetically by family name, and only characters who played a significant major role in the series are listed.

Star Trek: Deep Space Nine was a science fiction television show of the Star Trek franchise that aired between 1993 and 1999. Many of the characters appear in other programs and films comprising the wider Star Trek science fiction universe.

For the main cast of the show, see List of Star Trek Deep Space Nine cast members.

Recurring characters

Bareil Antos
Bareil Antos is a Bajoran Vedek played by Philip Anglim.

He first appears in the episode "In the Hands of the Prophets" in the first season, where he is introduced as a Bajoran religious leader, and is the target of an assassination plot. Bareil becomes a recurring character noted for his relationship with Major Kira Nerys, a subplot that begins at the start of season 2 and concludes in "Lifesupport".

Bareil becomes romantically involved with Kira. He runs against Vedek Winn Adami for the role of Kai, but is forced to drop out to protect the reputation of the previous Kai, Opaka. Bareil is injured in a shuttle explosion, and Dr. Julian Bashir has to replace his failing organs with cybernetics so that he can continue to advise Winn in negotiations with the Cardassians. His continued efforts in this weakened state cause brain damage, and eventually his death.

In the mirror universe episode "Resurrection", the Bareil from that universe is a petty thief who is close to the alternate Kira. He leaves his universe in an attempt to steal an orb.

 "In the Hands of the Prophets"
 "The Circle"
 "The Siege"
 "Shadowplay"
 "The Collaborator"
 "Fascination" 
 "Life Support"
 "Resurrection" (Mirror Bareil)

Brunt
Brunt is a liquidator with the Ferengi Commerce Authority (FCA), portrayed by Jeffrey Combs. He is the nemesis of Quark, whom he perceives as a threat to the Ferengi way of life, and often attempts to either destroy him or to supplant Grand Nagus Zek (although at one time, he did help Quark rescue Ishka from the Dominion).  By sharp contrast, his mirror universe counterpart was a friendly and congenial person, with unrequited feelings for his universe's Ezri Tigan, who ended up being murdered by the Intendant (mirror-Kira Nerys).

Brunt appeared in eight episodes beginning with Season Three's "Family Business."

 "Family Business"
 "Bar Association" 
 "Body Parts"
 "Ferengi Love Songs" 
 "The Magnificent Ferengi"
 "Profit and Lace"
 "The Emperor's New Cloak" (Mirror Brunt)
 "The Dogs of War"

Cretak, Kimara
Kimara Cretak is a Senator and representative of the Romulan empire for a short time aboard Deep Space Nine. She is accused of treason against the Star Empire and found guilty in the episode "Inter Arma Enim Silent Leges." The ending of the episode leaves her fate ambiguous, with it unclear if she will be imprisoned or executed. Kimara Cretak was first portrayed by Megan Cole in "Image in the Sand" and "Shadows and Symbols," and Adrienne Barbeau in "Inter Arma Enim Silent Leges."

Damar
Damar is a Cardassian military officer portrayed by Casey Biggs. As a glinn, he served under Gul Dukat aboard the freighter Groumall, and later as Gul Dukat's aide when the Cardassian Union joined the Dominion and then captured Deep Space Nine. Damar discovered a way to disable the Federation's self-replicating mines, which had been preventing the Dominion from sending reinforcements from the Gamma Quadrant through the Bajoran wormhole, and was recommended for promotion to the rank of gul.
As the Federation re-took the station, Damar learned that Tora Ziyal had been helping Kira and others undermine them and promptly killed her. This earned him personal enmity from Kira.

After Dukat's subsequent mental breakdown following his daughter's death, Damar was promoted to first gul and then legate. As leader, he learned that the Dominion was merely using the Cardassians as pawns in its effort to conquer the Alpha Quadrant, so he switched sides and encouraged his people to fight the Dominion. As leader of the new Cardassian rebellion, he had to accept Federation aid and advice from a "Starfleet advisor," Colonel Kira Nerys, who was given a Starfleet field commission of commander to take on the role. In his struggles as a resistance fighter, particularly when his wife and child were taken and killed by the Dominion, he came to understand the Bajoran perspective during Cardassia's occupation of Bajor.

While fighting beside Commander Kira Nerys and Elim Garak in a final push to retake Cardassia Prime, Damar was killed in action.

Damar appeared in 23 episodes beginning with Season Four's "Return to Grace".

Producer Ira Behr hired Biggs having seen him in the early IMAX film Alamo: The Price of Freedom.

Dax

Dax is a Trill symbiont, who has been "joined" to nine humanoid Trills:
 Lela Dax
 Tobin Dax
 Emony Dax
 Audrid Dax
 Torias Dax
 Joran Dax portrayed by Jeff McBride and Leigh McCloskey
 Curzon Dax portrayed by Frank Owen Smith
 Jadzia Dax portrayed by Terry Farrell
 Ezri Dax portrayed by Nicole de Boer

Other Dax hosts in the series were:
 Verad Dax, portrayed by John Glover when Verad steals the Dax symbiont from Jadzia's body for a few hours in the episode "Invasive Procedures"
 Yedrin Dax, portrayed by Gary Frank as the great-grandson of Jadzia Dax and Worf in a later eliminated timeline in "Children of Time"

During the first six seasons of the show, Jadzia was the Dax host; in the seventh and final season, the symbiont was transferred to Ezri in an emergency procedure to save Dax's life. Unlike previous hosts, Ezri had not undergone the arduous selection process required before being joined, as she was simply the only Trill available. Over the course of the show's run, much of the backstory of the previous hosts of the Dax symbiont was established. Benjamin Sisko was an old friend of Curzon, the host immediately prior to Jadzia, and Sisko regarded Curzon as a mentor. This previous relationship explains Sisko's use of the fond nickname, “Old Man”, for Dax.

Dukat

Former commanding officer of Terok Nor, the Cardassian space station that was renamed Deep Space Nine after it was ceded to the Bajorans and placed under the administration of the Federation, following the end of Cardassia's occupation of Bajor. Despite the liberation of Bajor and the transfer of the station, Dukat maintains his interest in both Deep Space Nine and Bajoran politics, becoming a key player in the Cardassian alliance with the Dominion. This alliance pits the Dominion of the Gamma Quadrant against the Federation and Bajor in a war that threatens the independence of the Alpha Quadrant.

Reception
In 2009, IGN ranked Dukat as the 15th best character of Star Trek overall, noting the character as a complicated and nuanced 'bad guy'. They note the character's morality in "Indiscretion" (Season 4, Episode 5) as well as his introduction in the premiere episode of Star Trek: Deep Space Nine, "Emissary".

In 2016, ScreenRant rated Dukat as the 8th best character in Star Trek overall as presented in television and film. Time magazine rated Gul Dukat the seventh best villain of the Star Trek franchise in 2016.

In 2018, CBR ranked Gul Dukat the 3rd best recurring character of all Star Trek.

Eddington, Michael
Michael Eddington was a Starfleet security officer holding the rank of lieutenant commander. He was stationed on Deep Space Nine by Starfleet due to their lack of complete trust in Odo. Following orders from a Starfleet admiral, he sabotaged the Defiants cloaking system when Captain Sisko defied orders by taking the ship on a mission to the Gamma Quadrant. On another occasion, he was instrumental in helping to recover the command staff of the station after a transporter malfunction required the storage of their neural patterns in the station computer and the preservation of their physical forms in a holosuite program.

Eddington later defected to the Maquis after working for them to steal several industrial grade replicators destined for the Cardassian Union. He likened himself and Sisko to characters from Les Miserables ("Jean Valjean" and "Javert", respectively), but was eventually captured and imprisoned. He was later killed while fighting alongside Sisko in a successful attempt to rescue survivors of a Maquis colony from the Dominion.

Michael Eddington was portrayed by Kenneth Marshall, appearing as a recurring character beginning in Season Three's "The Search, Part I".

Reception 
In 2018, CBR ranked Eddington the 17th best recurring character of all Star Trek.

In 2016, the character was ranked as the 77th most important character in service to Starfleet within the Star Trek science fiction universe by Wired magazine.

Fontaine, Vic

Holographic lounge-singer, featured on Quark's holosuites.

Garak, Elim

A former Cardassian spy turned tailor doing business on Deep Space 9.

In 2015, SyFy rated Garak as among the top 21 most interesting supporting characters of Star Trek.

Gowron

The character Gowron debuted in 1990 in the Star Trek: The Next Generation episode "Reunion" (directed by Jonathan Frakes), and was featured in several episodes of Deep Space Nine over the show's run.

In 2015, SyFy rated Gowron as among the top 21 most interesting supporting characters of Star Trek.

Ishka

Ishka, a Ferengi, is the mother of Quark and Rom, both of whom affectionately address her as "Moogie." She causes trouble for the family by wearing clothes and earning profit, two activities that are forbidden to female Ferengi, and is unrepentant about her actions when discovered by the Ferengi Commerce Authority. Later in the series, she begins a romantic relationship with Grand Nagus Zek and eventually persuades him to begin changing the regulations that govern Ferengi business, with far-reaching consequences for that society.

Ishka ("Moogie") is introduced in season 3 "Family Business" as Quark and Rom's mother.

Leeta

Leeta is a recurring character (17 episodes) on Deep Space Nine, portrayed by Chase Masterson. Introduced in season three's "Explorers", she is a Bajoran employed as a dabo girl in Quark's bar. After a brief romantic relationship with Julian Bashir, she married Rom and therefore ended the series as First Lady of Ferenginar.

Although initially played as a stereotypical "airhead", over the course of the series it is revealed that she is an intelligent woman who chooses to maintain a carefree attitude. She is a ringleader when Quark's employees attempt to start a trade union, and also volunteers to play temporary host to one of Jadzia Dax's former personalities. She explained in "Let He Who Is Without Sin..." that dabo girls actually have to be good at arithmetic, to ensure that the house always makes a profit.

Unlike most Bajoran characters, Leeta is never given a family name. The non-canon novels explain that this is because she was brought up in an orphanage during the Cardassian Occupation, and thus her actual family background is unknown.

Reception 
In 2015, SyFy rated Leeta as among the top 21 most interesting supporting characters of Star Trek.
In 2018, CBR ranked Leeta the 7th best recurring character of all Star Trek.

Martok

Klingon General who befriends Worf. Later in the series, Martok becomes Chancellor of the Klingon Empire. Martok was played by J.G. Hertzler.

Martok is introduced in season 4 opener, "The Way of the Warrior".

In 2015, SyFy rated Martok among the top 21 most interesting supporting characters of Star Trek.

Mila
Mila, a female Cardassian played by Julianna McCarthy, was for over three decades the housekeeper of Enabran Tain, the head of the Obsidian Order. Possibly, during their time together, Tain and Mila had a child, whom they named Elim Garak. Due to Tain's position, it was decided to hide the fact that he was Garak's father. No confession from Tain, Mila, or Garak was made supporting this, but Garak does treat Mila as a mother as it is most likely that she was the only such figure in his life. In 2371, Tain considered having Mila killed because she knew too much about him. However, he did not go through with her execution. She was killed by Dominion soldiers on the eve of Cardassia's liberation from the Dominion. She appeared in three episodes as well as in the novel A Stitch in Time by Andrew J. Robinson.

Doctor Mora Pol
Doctor Mora Pol was the Bajoran scientist who was assigned to study the Changeling who would become known as Odo. Dr. Mora studied and taught Odo at the Bajoran Center for Science during the Occupation of Bajor from 2358 to 2365. When Odo assumed the shape of a humanoid, he imitated Dr. Mora's hairstyle.

Odo initially resented Dr. Mora for failing to realize he was sentient. Under pressure from the Cardassians to get answers and not fully understanding what he was dealing with, Dr. Mora used some questionable methods in his experiments. Odo left the institute two years later. They would not reconcile their differences until 2373, when Dr. Mora arrived on Deep Space Nine to assist Odo in treating an infant changeling.

Dr. Mora Pol was played by actor James Sloyan.

Morn

Morn, played by Mark Allen Shepherd, is a Lurian male, the first member of his species seen in Star Trek. Morn is a frequent customer in Quark's bar, often present in the background of scenes there. Morn is named after Norm Peterson, a character from the television series Cheers.

According to make-up designer Michael Westmore, on the first day of filming the series the director chose Morn randomly from among several prosthetic characters. Westmore went to great lengths to ensure that Morn could talk if the character ever had a line, but Morn remained silent throughout the series. This became a running gag, with other characters commenting several times how talkative he was. Morn is credited with knowing the funniest joke in the universe, and in several episodes an incidental character is seen to start laughing as they leave his side. Quark sometimes breaks down laughing when he tries to retell the joke, and always gives up by saying that no one can tell it like Morn. Despite this, Morn rarely seems to get Quark's jokes, and when he does, it takes him a while.

Morn's existence as a fixture at Quark's bar is mocked in the episode "Who Mourns for Morn?" when Quark sets up a holo-imager to project an image of Morn on his regular stool, quietly drinking. No one realizes that it is not real until Sisko and Dax run into the bar to let people know that Morn died. It is later revealed that he did not die but had faked his death. Mark Allen Shepherd plays a dual role in this episode: apart from his regular appearance as Morn, he plays a Bajoran officer invited to sit in Morn's usual chair at the bar.

Often, other characters refer to something Morn has done that, to the viewer, would seem uncharacteristic for Morn. For example, when it became clear that war with the Dominion was inevitable, Morn threw a chair at Quark, then ran naked across the Promenade screaming "We're all doomed!" Following that, he supposedly rushed into the Bajoran temple and threw himself at the feet of Major Kira, crying out to the Prophets for protection. Lieutenant Commander Worf claimed that Morn was a formidable sparring partner, and the pair fought in the holosuites on a weekly basis. Jadzia Dax also said she had nearly become romantic with Morn, except that Morn turned her down.

Very little is revealed about Morn or his species on the show. Quark establishes in "Through the Looking Glass" that Morn has more than one heart. In "The Way of the Warrior," it was implied Lurians are usually found near the Ionite Nebula; a hostile Klingon suggested it was suspicious to find Morn so far from there. It was revealed in the episode "Who Mourns for Morn?" that he had been previously involved in some criminal activities, the most notable being a robbery in which his crew stole 1,000 bricks of gold-pressed latinum. Like all Lurians, Morn has two stomachs; Quark realized that he had extracted the liquid latinum from the bricks and was storing it in one stomach, causing his hair to fall out. Morn regurgitated 100 bricks' worth and gave it to Quark as a reward for helping to get the other thieves arrested.

Morn also appeared in the Star Trek: The Next Generation episode "Birthright, Part I" and made a cameo in the Star Trek: Voyager episode "Caretaker." Because of these appearances, this has made Morn one of the few characters to appear in three of the Star Trek series, alongside Quark (who appeared in TNG, DS9, and Voyager), William Riker (TNG, DS9 (as transporter clone), Voyager, Enterprise, and Picard), Jean-Luc Picard (TNG, DS9, and Picard), Deanna Troi (TNG, Voyager, Enterprise, and Picard), Kang (The Original Series, DS9, and Voyager), and Q (TNG, DS9, Voyager, and Picard).

Nog

The character Nog, Rom's son, was played by Aron Eisenberg.

He develops a close friendship to Jake Sisko throughout the series.

Working at the station's bar at first, Nog later becomes the first Ferengi to join Starfleet in "Facets", to the dismay of his uncle, Quark, the aforementioned bar's proprietor. He is ultimately promoted to the rank of Lieutenant Junior Grade by Benjamin Sisko during the final episode of the series, "What You Leave Behind".

O'Brien, Keiko

Keiko O'Brien, born Keiko Ishikawa, is played by Rosalind Chao. She is a professional botanist and the wife of Miles O'Brien in both The Next Generation and Deep Space Nine.

Keiko married Miles O'Brien aboard the USS Enterprise-D in the TNG episode "Data's Day". A year later, temporarily stuck in Ten-Forward, she gave birth to a daughter, Molly (TNG episode "Disaster").

Shortly after arriving at Deep Space Nine, Keiko decided to start a school. Jake Sisko and Nog were the first students to enroll. Later, Keiko went on a botanical expedition to Bajor when pregnant with her second child. An accident endangered mother and child on the way back to DS9. Doctor Julian Bashir saved them both by removing the fetus and implanting it into Kira Nerys' womb. In her honor, the child was named "Kirayoshi."

When the Dominion War began, Keiko and the children were evacuated from the war zones. They remained away for a time until the fields of battle had shifted far enough to make Deep Space Nine safe again. After the war, the O'Brien family relocated to Earth when Miles became an instructor at Starfleet Academy.

In 2017, IndieWire ranked Keiko as the 14th best character on Star Trek: The Next Generation.

O'Brien, Molly

Molly O'Brien, played by Hana Hatae, is the daughter of Keiko and Miles O'Brien and the older sister of Kirayoshi. She originally appeared on Star Trek: The Next Generation.

Molly was born in 2368, with Worf delivering her, on the USS Enterprise-D in the TNG episode "Disaster." She moved to Deep Space Nine when Miles was assigned there.

In the DS9 episode "Time's Orphan," the O'Briens went on a picnic to Golana IV, where Molly accidentally fell into an abandoned time portal and emerged as an 18-year-old (played by Michelle Krusiec). From her point of view, she had experienced approximately ten years of solitary existence. Back at Deep Space Nine, she was wild and uncontrollable, unable to cope with life on the space station; after a violent altercation in Quark's, Starfleet officials intended to place her in a mental health institution. The O'Briens returned to Golana IV, hoping to send Molly back through the time portal to the place and time she had become accustomed to, preferring her happiness over a possible lifetime of confinement. However, she was returned to the point where she had first entered, allowing the adult Molly to help her child counterpart return home, erasing the adult Molly from history in the process.

Opaka
Opaka, played by Camille Saviola, was the Kai or spiritual leader of the Bajorans through the latter years of the Cardassian occupation and the first few months after it ended in 2369. Opaka recognized Benjamin Sisko as the long-awaited Emissary of the Prophets, although he did not return her enthusiasm.

In response to a prophetic Orb experience, Opaka left Bajor for the first time to pay an unannounced visit to DS9. Journeying with Sisko and Kira through the wormhole, she was killed in a runabout crash on the Ennis penal moon, and was then resurrected by the artificial microbes present there. The microbes were specifically designed to only work on the moon, forcing her to stay behind. She took this as an opportunity to help end the prisoners' fanatical clan war.

During the Cardassian occupation, Opaka had been a collaborator: she gave away the whereabouts of a rebel base and her son was killed in the subsequent attack. The Cardassians had threatened to destroy some Bajoran towns so by betraying the rebels (including her own son) she saved thousands of Bajoran lives. Later on, Bareil Antos dropped out of the election for Kai in an effort to keep this secret from ruining Opaka's legacy. This led to the election of the more controversial Winn Adami.

Rom

Rom is Quark's brother and father of Nog, and is played by Max Grodénchik. The character has a long arc, and as a Ferengi is often involved with stories for them, but also due to his technical abilities is a part of many of the technical challenges of running the station.

In 2015, SyFy rated Rom as among the top 21 most interesting supporting characters of Star Trek. In 2013, Wired magazine said that Rom was arguably the best character in Star Trek: Deep Space Nine, and even in the entire Star Trek franchise. The praise how  Max Grodénchik brought the character to life, presenting a nuanced and layered character over the seven season run. They note how Rom transforms from a comedic sidekick for Quark to Universe saving character that was much more important to the series. In 2021, Julian Beauvais writing for Screen Rant, thought that Rom was an honorable character for trying to take care of his family, using his engineering abilities to help defeat the Dominion during the war, and as Grand Nagus planning to reform Ferengi society to be more egalitarian.

Ross, William J.
Vice Admiral William J. Ross, played by Barry Jenner, was the Field Commander of Starfleet forces during the Dominion War and was the coordinator of Starfleet's defense of the Bolian and Bajoran fronts in the early stages of that war.

His command post was on Starbase 375, where he was in direct command of the 7th Tactical Wing. During the first three months of the war, Ross was under severe pressure to halt the advance of the Dominion. Ross did this by making Captain Sisko his adjutant, to relieve himself of making minor tactical plans and reports. This action gave Ross the initiative to find the "Argolis Cluster Sensor Array." This sensor array was the Dominion's line of sight over all the Bajoran and Bolian fronts at the start of the War. Ross, along with Sisko, planned the attack on the Argolis Array and succeeded in the destruction of the array in late March 2374. As the war progressed, Ross took a much more tactical role rather than strategically planning the war effort.

After the first battle of Chin'toka, Ross was posted aboard Deep Space Nine to command the Allied forces presently hemmed in at Chin'toka.

It was later revealed that Ross was one of the few Starfleet personnel to know of the existence of Section 31. Although he collaborates with Section 31 in one of their operations, like Julian Bashir he staunchly maintains that he is not a member of the organization.

During the Battle of Cardassia, Ross led the Starfleet wing of the assault fleet. He devised the planned assault on Cardassia and, soon afterwards, presided over the signing of the Treaty of Bajor at which he gave a speech to the delegates.

Ross appears in twelve episodes beginning with the Season Six episode "A Time to Stand." In 2016, the character of Admiral Ross was ranked as the 41st most important character of Starfleet within the Star Trek science fiction universe by Wired magazine. In 2020, Bounding Into Comics ranked Admiral Ross as one of the top ten most impactful recurring characters in the Star Trek franchise.

Shakaar Edon
Shakaar Edon was a resistance leader, farmer, and later First Minister of Bajor. He was played by Duncan Regehr.

A onetime farmer in Bajor's Dahkur Province, Shakaar returned to his fields in 2369 after 25 years of fighting the Cardassian occupiers, only to enter politics as his world's secular leader in 2371. As the head and namesake of Kira's resistance cell, he agreed to let her go on her first raid at age 13 to fill in a vacancy in the ranks, and reteamed with her years later during a near-violent showdown with Kai Winn over the return of promised soil reclamators.

After that encounter, and the support he received for his handling of it, Shakaar handily won the position as Bajor's second post-occupation First Minister, defeating acting Minister Winn in an election. As he works with Kira in her role of senior Bajoran on DS9, Shakaar realizes he has fallen in love with her and they begin a relationship.  He successfully pushed to fast-track Bajor's admission to the UFP, but that act was postponed at the last minute by Emissary Benjamin Sisko's pagh'tem'far (sacred vision) that it was not the right time.

As Shakaar and Kira's affair played out, he had a hard time accepting her carrying the O'Briens' transplanted second child to term after an accident in 2373.  Soon afterward, he and Kira part ways romantically, after a visit to the Kendra shrine on Bajor revealed that they were not meant to walk the same path.  Kira still respects him as Bajor's best leader.

Shakaar is used to death threats and he routinely ignores them, but a True Way alien operative nearly kills him twice during the Federation conference on DS9, first by sending his turbolift car into free fall, and later by almost getting his quarters depressurized. According to Dukat, Shakaar slept with every woman in his resistance cell except Kira—but Dukat's jealousy of the Major should be taken into account.

Sisko, Joseph

Joseph Sisko, father of Captain Benjamin Sisko, was played by Brock Peters.

Joseph ran a restaurant in New Orleans called "Sisko's Creole Kitchen" (DS9 S7Ep1: "Image in the Sand"), with a particular specialty each night (generally seafood). While Nog was at Starfleet Academy, he commuted from San Francisco to dine, as Joseph obtained Ferengi tube grubs especially for Nog. Joseph's grandson, Jake Sisko, often worked at the restaurant, and Benjamin worked there after the Pah Wraiths collapsed the wormhole (events of S6Ep26: "Tears of the Prophets", S7Ep1: "Image in the Sand". S7Ep2: "Shadows and Symbols").

Joseph was first married to a woman named Sarah, but when their son Benjamin was a year and a half old, Sarah left, eventually moving to Australia and dying in a shuttle accident. Joseph remarried soon after; Benjamin and his stepmother had such a close relationship and Joseph having been greatly emotionally wounded by Sarah leaving, could not bring himself to disclose who Benjamin's true mother was. Joseph was completely unaware that 'Sarah' was, in fact, a Prophet that had taken physical form through possession of Human Sarah's body in order to ensure Benjamin's birth. Years later, Benjamin and Jake discover the truth in the episodes "Image in the Sand" and "Shadows and Symbols".

Though Joseph Sisko does eventually admit to Benjamin the truth about Sarah when pressed, he vows to take his gumbo recipe "to the grave."

Sloan, Luther
Luther Sloan was played by William Sadler. An operative in the intelligence agency known as Section 31, Sloan appeared in three episodes of Star Trek: Deep Space Nine: "Inquisition", "Inter Arma Enim Silent Leges", and "Extreme Measures".

In 2374, Sloan placed Dr. Julian Bashir in a psychologically intense holodeck scenario designed to test his loyalties to the Federation. Satisfied that Bashir was a steadfast Starfleet officer, Sloan offered Bashir a position in Section 31, knowing of the doctor's fondness for 20th century espionage fiction. Bashir adamantly refused, but Sloan was content to let him consider the offer.

In 2375, Sloan assigned Bashir for a mission to gather information on Koval, chairman of the Romulan Tal Shiar, claiming that the doctor was already a member of Section 31. Bashir initially refused, but agreed with Captain Sisko that this would allow them to learn more about Section 31's operations and possible connections to Starfleet Command. However, unbeknownst to both of them, Sloan had already enlisted the assistance of Admiral William Ross and thus succeeded in strengthening covert ties to one highly placed Romulan and subverting the career of another. Sloan appeared to perish at Koval's hand, but later appeared in Bashir's quarters to thank him for playing his part and living up to Sloan's high expectations of him.

Later that year, Bashir discovered evidence that Section 31 was responsible for infecting Odo with a genocidal virus intended to bring an end to the Dominion War. With the assistance of Miles O'Brien, Bashir lured Sloan to Deep Space Nine and captured him. Rather than risk handing Bashir the cure, Sloan triggered a neuro-depolarizing device in his brain, effectively killing himself. After stabilizing Sloan, Bashir and O'Brien linked their minds to his in a last-ditch effort to secure information that would lead to a cure. While inside Sloan's mind, Bashir was offered secret information that could supposedly bring about the end of Section 31. This was Sloan's way of delaying Bashir from escaping with the knowledge needed to save Odo's life, and the lives of the Founders.

Solbor
Solbor was played by James Otis. Solbor was a Bajoran and an assistant to Kai Winn. He was killed by Kai Winn when he threatened to expose Dukat and the Kai's betrayal of the Prophets. He appeared in three episodes.

Tain, Enabran
Enabran Tain, played by Paul Dooley, was a Cardassian, the former head of the Obsidian Order and the biological father of Elim Garak. He never admitted this fact publicly, believing that his son was a "weakness [he] couldn't afford."

Tain was the head of the Obsidian Order for twenty years, and the only head of the Obsidian Order to live long enough to retire. As the head of the Order, Tain trusted no one, with the exception of his housekeeper, Mila. He was known for his ruthlessness, and many said that he lacked a heart. Tain was also Garak's immediate superior, whom he trained and molded into a mirror image of himself. Nevertheless, Tain was directly responsible for exiling Garak after being betrayed by him in some way.

Tain attempted to stage a comeback by destroying the Founders' homeworld with a combined fleet of Obsidian Order and Tal Shiar ships. His plan was compromised by a Changeling infiltrator, and the fleet was destroyed by the Jem'Hadar. Tain was assumed to have perished when his ship exploded, but he was actually captured by the Dominion and detained at Internment Camp 371.

In 2373, Tain modified the camp barracks' life support system to send a subspace signal to Garak, indicating he was alive. By the time Garak reached him, he was dying of a heart condition. On his deathbed, after being sure all his enemies were dead, Tain asked Garak to escape and seek vengeance on the Dominion for what it had done to him. Garak agreed, but only if Tain asked him as his father. Tain died after acknowledging that Garak was his son.

Tora Ziyal
Tora Ziyal is the half Cardassian / half Bajoran daughter of Gul Dukat and Tora Naprem. She spent most of her early life with her mother, and thus her name is structured as are all Bajoran names (with the family name first). Her given name, Ziyal, is a popular Cardassian name. She was played by Cyia Batten in "Indiscretion" and "Return to Grace," by Tracy Middendorf in the episode "For the Cause," and by Melanie Smith, over six episodes from season five's  "In Purgatory's Shadow" to season six's "Sacrifice of Angels."

Ziyal was first introduced in the Season 4 episode "Indiscretion." In this episode, Gul Dukat accompanied Kira Nerys to the crash site of the Cardassian prison transport Ravinok. On the crash site (in the Dozaria system) Kira found out Dukat went along because his mistress (Tora Naprem) was aboard the Ravinok. They discovered the grave of Tora Naprem, and Dukat confessed Tora Naprem and he had a daughter, Tora Ziyal, who was also on the transport. Dukat originally intended on killing Ziyal to protect his career, as it was an abomination for a Cardassian and a Bajoran to have a child, but Kira's arguments and his own paternal love convinced him not to kill his daughter. They find Ziyal in a Breen prison camp on the planet and free her.

Even though her mixed heritage made living on either Cardassia or Bajor unrealistic due to the inherent prejudices, she ended up spending time on Bajor attending a university there.  After living there for a short time, Ziyal moved to DS9 where she felt more comfortable and at ease among the station's diverse population, with the bonus of being closer to Major Kira whom she considered a big sister. She was also friends with Elim Garak and Julian Bashir. She briefly evacuated to Bajor after the Cardassian/Dominion troops reclaimed DS9 (Terok Nor) from the Federation but eventually returned to be near her father Gul Dukat and her close friend Kira Nerys. After she came to realize what type of man her father really was, she agreed to help Quark liberate Rom, Kira, Jake and Leeta from prison.  They had been imprisoned for attempting to sabotage the Cardassian/Dominion force's planned disarmament of the Federation minefield around the wormhole, which was preventing the Gamma quadrant's Dominion reinforcements from entering the Alpha Quadrant (Season 6 episode "Sacrifice of Angels"). While her father was attempting to convince her to flee the station and return to Cardassia with him before the Federation troops retook the station, she was killed by Gul Dukat's first officer Damar after he overheard her confession to her father about having helped free the New Resistance members. Dukat underwent an immediate and near catatonic mental breakdown after witnessing his daughter's death right before his eyes.

Troi, Lwaxana 

A Betazoid ambassador and the mother of Deanna Troi, Lwaxana occasionally visits DS9 and causes consternation for Security Chief Odo.
In 2015, SyFy rated Lwaxana as among the top 21 most interesting supporting characters of Star Trek.

Weyoun
Dominion Vorta character played by Jeffrey Combs, debuting in "To the Death". He is killed in his initial appearance, only for it to be subsequently revealed that he is cloned. Several such Weyouns appear in the series up until the series finale when the eighth clone is killed by Garak.

In 2013, Slate magazine ranked Weyoun one of the ten best villains in the Star Trek franchise.

In 2015, SyFy rated Weyoun as among the top 21 most interesting supporting characters of Star Trek.

The character Weyoun was also included in the Star Trek novel Millennium: Fall of Terok Nor/War of the Prophets/Inferno which was written by authors Judith Reeves-Stevens and Garfield Reeves-Stevens.

Winn Adami

Kai Winn Adami held the title of "Vedek" during the Cardassian occupation of Bajor, and claimed to have been beaten for her religious teachings. She had a contemptuous attitude toward Bajorans who fought in the underground resistance cells, because she felt she did not get proper credit for helping to fight for Bajor's liberation. She was played by Louise Fletcher.

Winn makes her first appearance objecting to the teachings of Keiko O'Brien in the Deep Space Nine school, in the episode "In the Hands of the Prophets." In particular, she objects to Keiko's teaching of only the scientific information about the Bajoran wormhole, instead of teaching the religious mythos regarding it. Winn views the science-based teachings as blasphemy, and eventually her influence results in all of the Bajoran students being pulled from the school. Later, a bomb is detonated inside the school. Commander Benjamin Sisko meets with Vedek Bareil on Bajor and asks him to reprimand Winn before she stirs up more violence, but he declines to enter into the conflict. Winn also directs one of her supporters to assassinate Bareil, who is Winn's chief rival in the Vedek Assembly. The failed assassination attempt is made during a speech Bareil is giving calling for an end to conflicts over the school. Winn's involvement, although suspected by Major Kira Nerys, is never proven.

Ever the ambitious opportunist, Winn later aligned herself with an extremist group called "The Circle." The Circle's goal was to eliminate all external influences from Bajor, including the Federation, which would have served Winn's purposes in getting rid of Commander Sisko, whom she resented as the Emissary of the Prophets. The reward for her support would have been the guarantee of becoming Kai.

Eventually it was discovered that "The Circle" was actually being supplied by the Cardassians. Major Kira managed to sneak into the council chambers and presented the evidence to the Council of Ministers. When Kira announced she has the thumb scan of a Cardassian Gul signing off on a shipment of weapons to the Kressari, who in turn sent them on to The Circle, Winn immediately changed sides telling Minister Jaro that if he truly believes the Cardassians were not supplying the weapons, he should not mind an examination of the evidence.

In the episode "The Collaborator," the election for the next Kai approaches. Winn seeks out and obtains information about the Kendra Valley Massacre, which she uses to manipulate Major Kira into investigating Vedek Bareil Antos, who is in a relationship with Kira at the time. Ultimately, Bareil is forced to withdraw, resulting in Winn's election as Kai. Although Bareil is later proven innocent by Kira, he chooses not to reveal the truth, which is that Kai Opaka had actually been responsible for the massacre---a move that resulted in forty-three deaths, including that of her own son, but which had saved thousands of other Bajoran lives. Over the years, Bareil faithfully kept the secret to protect the Bajoran people and preserve their religion.

When the first minister of the provisional government dies, Winn gets herself appointed to the political office, and tries to reclaim soil reclamation equipment developed by the Bajoran agricultural ministry and loaned to a group of farmers. She wants to have it used to reclaim soil for cash crops for sale off-planet, while a group of farmers led by Shakaar, a former resistance leader, are trying to reclaim soil to produce food for Bajor; Shakaar and his people had been promised the reclamators, but Winn, now leading the government, reneges on the previous leadership's promise. A brief insurrection, with Shakaar's people preparing to fight security forces sent out by Winn, results in the security force leader and Shakaar burying the hatchet. Shakaar challenges Winn for the position of first minister in the upcoming election.

Throughout her service as both Vedek and Kai, Winn always proved to be selfish, arrogant, and power-hungry. She would do anything, and betray anyone to advance her own career and agenda. She is also jealous of other people receiving visions from the Prophets, especially the "alien", Sisko the Emissary, because she herself has never received a vision from the Prophets.

In the final days of the Dominion War, Winn finally received what she believed to be a vision from the Prophets, who tell her that a guide will soon appear to her. In reality, this vision was from the Pah Wraiths, and the "guide" was Gul Dukat, who had been surgically altered to look like a Bajoran.

Dukat and Winn soon became lovers, and he convinced her that to restore Bajor, she must release the Pah Wraiths, who he claimed were the true prophets of Bajor. To do this, Winn obtained the Kosst Amojan, a forbidden text, but found that the pages were blank. Her servant Solbor discovered what she and Dukat were planning. He revealed Dukat's true identity and threatened to expose them. As Winn killed him to prevent this revelation, a drop of blood fell from the knife Winn stabbed him with, and onto the blank pages of the Kosst Amojan, revealing the text. Later when Dukat attempted to read the Kosst Amojan himself, he was blinded (the text could only be read by the Kai), and cast out onto the streets by Winn. After studying the text, Winn discovered there is only one way to release the Pah Wraiths from the Fire Caves and hesitantly allowed Dukat to rejoin her.

Back on Deep Space Nine in Vic Fontaine's holosuite program, the Prophets send Sisko a premonition about a dangerous situation on Bajor. In the series finale "What You Leave Behind" and after the battle of Cardassia, Sisko traveled to the Fire Caves on Bajor to confront Winn and Dukat. While Dukat and Sisko fight, Winn realized she has made the wrong choices and that she had been blinded by her own ambitions. In an effort to correct all that she had done and redeem herself, she attempted to throw the book of the Pah Wraiths into the fire and destroy it. Before she could do so, Dukat disintegrated her using powers given to him by the Pah Wraiths.

Reception 
In 2018, CBR ranked Winn the 11th best recurring character of all Star Trek.

In 2013, Slate magazine ranked Kai Winn one of the ten best villains in the Star Trek franchise.

Yates, Kasidy
Kasidy Danielle Yates, played by Penny Johnson Jerald, is a human civilian freighter captain. She is introduced to Benjamin Sisko by his son Jake, who feels it is time for Sisko to start dating again after the death of his first wife Jennifer at Wolf 359. The character is first introduced in the episode "Family Business" in season three, and is a recurring character (15 episodes) thereafter.

Jake's attempt at matchmaking is successful, and Kasidy and Sisko become lovers, even after her arrest and eventual imprisonment for aiding the Maquis in "For the Cause". Following her release from prison, the two resume their relationship in "Rapture".

Eventually, Kasidy becomes Sisko's second wife and, at the end of the series, she becomes pregnant with their child. When Sisko leaves to join the Prophets, he tells her that he will be away for a while, but would eventually return to her.

Kasidy and Sisko's romance was ranked the 8th best romantic couple in Star Trek, in 2020 by ScreenRant.

Zek
Zek was the Grand Nagus of the Ferengi Alliance throughout most of the 24th century. He is played by Wallace Shawn.

Zek attempted retirement shortly after the discovery of the wormhole near Bajor. He arrived on DS9 and during a business meeting announced Quark would be his successor, and then appeared to have died. Eventually it was discovered that Zek faked his death by entering into a trance his attendant Maihar'Du taught him. The whole set-up was a test to see if his son Krax was ready to take over, but Krax failed miserably: by trying to seize power (assisted by Rom); by attempting to kill Quark instead of acquiring it quietly. The proper approach was to learn all the favorable deals and assume power by subterfuge and cunning, in keeping with 'Rule of Acquisition' number 168: "Whisper your way to success".

Zek visited the Bajoran Prophets within the wormhole in an attempt to gather information about the future which he could use to increase his profits. Instead, the Prophets 'devolved' Zek's personality to that of a proto-Ferengi, before his people had dedicated their lives to the acquisition of wealth. During his time in this state, Zek made many radical reforms to his people's laws and government directing his people away from their greedy ways, including reformatting the long-standing Ferengi Rules of Acquisition. He was eventually changed back and his reforms nullified after Quark appealed to the Prophets' fear of interaction with other corporeal life forms that might come to their domains to investigate the change. (DS9: "Prophet Motive")

During a Tongo tournament on Ferenginar, Zek received a tip from Ishka, the mother of Quark and Rom, which helped him make a comeback to win the tournament. They eventually fell in love and were briefly broken up by Quark at the prodding of Liquidator Brunt, who was plotting to succeed Zek as Nagus. The effort failed: Quark became aware of the plan, stopped Brunt's takeover and got Zek and Ishka together again. (DS9: "Ferengi Love Songs")

Zek, suffering from failing memory, bequeathed all his financial dealings to the financially brilliant Ishka, eventually caving in to her not-so-subtle prods for female rights. He was once again deposed, this time by Brunt, after he amended the Ferengi constitution to allow females to wear clothes in public. He was reinstated after the populace learned of the new and exciting business opportunities such reforms would pave. Under Ishka's influence, he further reformed the Ferengi political and economic system into a significantly less capitalist model. Eventually, he and Ishka retired to Risa after naming Rom as his successor.

Production 
Shawn described the makeup process as "a little bit disturbing and uncomfortable and exhausting". It took three hours to put on the makeup, and an hour to take it off, and he would be wearing it for at least twelve hours. Although the process was arduous, and he wouldn't have wanted to do it more than once a year, he appreciated the results and found that "To be in that world and to be in that makeup really liberated me in a way that I never experienced before — or since. I felt completely free, so it was a joyful experience."

Reception 
In 2018, CBR ranked Zek the 14th best recurring character of all Star Trek.

See also
 List of Star Trek characters

References

External links

 
Deep Space Nine
Star Trek Deep Space Nine